Olbia was a town of ancient Cilicia, mentioned by Stephanus of Byzantium. William Smith conjectures that Stephanus may have been confused with the town of Olbasa or Olbe.

References

Populated places in ancient Cilicia
Former populated places in Turkey
Lost ancient cities and towns